Jeff Shell is an American media executive who currently serves as the CEO for NBCUniversal, a subsidiary of Comcast.

Career 
In 2001, Shell served as president of FOX Cable Network Group and then as president of Comcast Programming Group. In 2019, it was announced that he would succeed Steve Burke as CEO of NBCUniversal. Shell assumed the role on January 1, 2020, and reports directly to Comcast CEO Brian L. Roberts.

In April 2008, Shell signed an open letter endorsing Barack Obama for the Pennsylvania primary. He was named by President Barack Obama as chairman of the Broadcasting Board of Governors replacing Sony Pictures executive Michael Lynton.

In May 2020, The New York Times reported that Shell was considering replacing CNBC's current primetime offerings of business reality shows with right-wing talk shows, in a bid to appeal to conservative viewers.

Personal life
Shell is married to Laura Fay Shell. Laura previously worked for Los Angeles County Supervisor Zev Yaroslavsky as his planning deputy until 2005. His sister is Dana Shell Smith, and his brother is Dan Shell of IMG College.

In 2015, he was awarded the Dorothy and Sherrill C. Corwin Human Relations Award by the American Jewish Committee. Shell is a 2010 inductee into the Southern California Jewish Sports Hall of Fame.

In January 2019, Shell, along with Cindy Crawford, her husband Rande Gerber, Mike Meldman, and Jay Sures, announced they would purchase the Beverly Hills deli, Nate 'n Al, to keep its doors open after three generations of family ownership.

References

 
 

Living people
American television executives
NBC executives
Place of birth missing (living people)
NBC chief executive officers
Comcast people
NBCUniversal people
20th-century American businesspeople
21st-century American businesspeople
UC Berkeley College of Engineering alumni
Harvard Business School alumni
1965 births
20th-century American Jews
21st-century American Jews